Plussulien is a commune in the Côtes-d'Armor department of Brittany in northwestern France.  It is home to the archeological site of Quelfénnec.

Population

Inhabitants of Plussulien are called plussulianais in French.

See also
Communes of the Côtes-d'Armor department

References

External links

Communes of Côtes-d'Armor